Shanghai Swimming Center is a station on Line 11 of the Shanghai Metro, which opened on August31, 2013.

This station is located underground near Shanghai Indoor Stadium station and Shanghai Stadium station.

References

Railway stations in Shanghai
Line 11, Shanghai Metro
Shanghai Metro stations in Xuhui District
Railway stations in China opened in 2013